The 2018 European Darts Grand Prix was the fifth of thirteen PDC European Tour events on the 2018 PDC Pro Tour. The tournament took place at Glaspalast, Sindelfingen, Germany, between 4–6 May 2018. It featured a field of 48 players and £135,000 in prize money, with £25,000 going to the winner.

Peter Wright was the defending champion after defeating Michael van Gerwen 6–0 in the 2017 final, but he was defeated 6–5 in the third round to Danny Noppert.

Michael van Gerwen won the tournament for a second time, defeating James Wade 8–3 in the final whilst averaging over 109 for the third successive game.

Prize money
This is how the prize money is divided:

Prize money will count towards the PDC Order of Merit, the ProTour Order of Merit and the European Tour Order of Merit, with one exception: should a seeded player lose in the second round (last 32), their prize money will not count towards any Orders of Merit, although they still receive the full prize money payment.

Qualification and format 
The top 16 entrants from the PDC ProTour Order of Merit on 27 March will automatically qualify for the event and will be seeded in the second round.

The remaining 32 places will go to players from five qualifying events – 18 from the UK Qualifier (held in Barnsley on 6 April), eight from the West/South European Qualifier (held on 3 May), four from the Host Nation Qualifier (held on 3 May), one from the Nordic & Baltic Qualifier (held on 23 February) and one from the East European Qualifier (held on 28 January).

Adrian Lewis withdrew prior to the draw through illness, and was replaced by a Host Nation Qualifier.

The following players will take part in the tournament:

Top 16
  Michael van Gerwen (winner)
  Peter Wright (third round)
  Rob Cross (third round)
  Michael Smith (semi-finals)
  Daryl Gurney (second round)
  Mensur Suljović (third round)
  Joe Cullen (quarter-finals)
  Dave Chisnall (quarter-finals)
  Ian White (third round)
  Kim Huybrechts (second round)
  Simon Whitlock (quarter-finals)
  Mervyn King (second round)
  Jelle Klaasen (second round)
  John Henderson (second round)
  Gerwyn Price (second round)
  Darren Webster (third round)

UK Qualifier
  Kyle Anderson (third round)
  Stephen Bunting (first round)
  Robert Owen (first round)
  Matt Padgett (second round)
  Adrian Lewis (withdrew)
  Alan Tabern (second round)
  James Wade (runner-up)
  Arron Monk (second round)
  Dawson Murschell (first round)
  Ricky Evans (first round)
  Steve Hine (first round)
  Peter Hudson (first round)
  Paul Nicholson (third round)
  Jamie Caven (second round)
  Andy Boulton (first round)
  Jamie Lewis (quarter-finals)
  Steve Lennon (first round)
  Kirk Shepherd (second round)

West/South European Qualifier
  Toni Alcinas (first round)
  Vincent van der Voort (second round)
  Danny Noppert (semi-finals)
  Mats Gies (first round)
  Jan Dekker (second round)
  Mareno Michels (first round)
  Jermaine Wattimena (third round)
  Dimitri Van den Bergh (first round)

Host Nation Qualifier
  Max Hopp (first round)
  Martin Schindler (second round)
  Gabriel Clemens (first round)
  Christian Bunse (first round)
  Robert Marijanović (second round)

Nordic & Baltic Qualifier
  Madars Razma (second round)

East European Qualifier
  Krzysztof Ratajski (first round)

Draw

References

2018 PDC European Tour
2018 in German sport
May 2018 sports events in Germany
Sports competitions in Baden-Württemberg